Bon Rud may refer to:
 Bon Rud, Fars
 Bon Rud District, in Isfahan Province